Sergei Orlov may refer to:

 Sergei Orlov (footballer, born 1974), Russian football player and coach
 Sergei Orlov (footballer, born 1989), Russian football player
 Sergei Orlov (sculptor) (1911–1971), Russian sculptor
 Sergei Vladimirovich Orlov (1880–1958), Russian-Soviet astrophysicist